Brooklyn "Brookie" Supreme (April 12, 1928 – September 6, 1948) was a red roan Belgian stallion noted for his extreme size. Although disputed, the horse may be the world record holder for largest (but not tallest) horse and was designated the world's heaviest horse. Each of his horseshoes required  of iron.

The horse was foaled on the Minneapolis, Minnesota farm of Earle Brown, who first exhibited him. Before becoming oversized, the stallion "had been Grand Champion of his breed in many state fairs". One of his great-grandfathers was another famous horse, Farceur 7332.

For much of his fame, Brooklyn Supreme was owned by Charles Grant Good of Ogden, Iowa; Ralph M. Fogleman of Callender, Iowa partnered with Good and exhibited the horse around the US, charging spectators 10 cents to view the animal.

See also
 List of historical horses

Notes

References

Individual draft horses
1928 animal births
1948 animal deaths